Miguel Sapochnik (born 1 July 1974) is an English film and television director of Argentine origin, and former storyboard artist. For his work as a director on the HBO epic fantasy series Game of Thrones, he won the award for Outstanding Directing for a Drama Series at the 68th Primetime Emmy Awards and Directors Guild of America Award for Outstanding Directing – Drama Series at the 69th Directors Guild of America Awards. Sapochnik also directed the science fiction film Repo Men.

Career
Born as Miguel Vicente Rosenberg-Sapochnik in London, England, Sapochnik began his career as a storyboard artist; some of his credits include Trainspotting (1996, directed by Danny Boyle) and The Winter Guest (1997, actor Alan Rickman's directorial debut).

In 2000, Sapochnik directed a 2000 short film titled The Dreamer, which he wrote and directed. He also directed the "Beautiful Inside" music video for singer Louise.

Between 2001 and 2005, he was a director of Snowflake in Hell Films Limited.

Sapochnik's feature film directorial debut was Repo Men (2010), starring Jude Law and Forest Whitaker.

Sapochnik has worked on American television series, directing episodes of Awake (2012), Fringe (2011–12), House (2011–12) and Mind Games (2014).

In 2015, Sapochnik directed two episodes of Game of Thrones for the show's fifth season, "The Gift" and "Hardhome." He returned to direct the final two episodes of Game of Thrones sixth season, "Battle of the Bastards" and "The Winds of Winter".  All of these episodes received acclaim from both critics and viewers. Sapochnik won an Emmy Award for Outstanding Directing for a Drama Series at the 68th Primetime Emmy Awards, for directing "Battle of the Bastards".

In 2016, Sapochnik directed the series premiere of the show Altered Carbon for Netflix.

In 2017, he directed an episode of Iron Fist.

In September 2017, he directed the third ("The Long Night") and fifth ("The Bells") episodes of the final season of Game of Thrones.

He was one of two showrunners of House of the Dragon, the first season of which premiered in premiered on August 21, 2022. In August 2022, it was announced that he would be leaving the show after the first season.

Personal life 
Sapochnik is of Argentine origin, and has been married to actress Alexis Raben since 2006.

He is Jewish.

Filmography
Film

Television

References

External links

 

Living people
1974 births
20th-century British Jews
21st-century British Jews
British expatriates in the United States
British storyboard artists
English film directors
English music video directors
English people of Argentine descent
English television directors
People from Hammersmith
Primetime Emmy Award winners